Douglas Carpenter (date of birth unknown-2011) was a lightweight rower who competed for Great Britain.

Rowing career
Carpenter was part of the lightweight eight that secured a silver medal at the 1976 World Rowing Championships in Villach, Austria.

In 1972 rowed for the Kingston Rowing Club in the final of the Thames Challenge Cup. He died in 2011.

References

Year of birth missing
2011 deaths
British male rowers
World Rowing Championships medalists for Great Britain